Paul August Schuette, Jr. (March 10, 1906 – October 20, 1960) was an American football offensive lineman in the National Football League for the New York Giants, Chicago Bears, and the Boston Braves.  He played football at the prestigious Lake Forest Academy in Lake Forest, Illinois and later at the University of Wisconsin–Madison. Schuette died as a result of an illness.

References

1906 births
1960 deaths
People from Manitowoc, Wisconsin
Sportspeople from Lake Forest, Illinois
Players of American football from South Bend, Indiana
Players of American football from Wisconsin
American football guards
New York Giants players
Chicago Bears players
Boston Braves (NFL) players
Lake Forest Academy alumni
Wisconsin Badgers football players